Swiss German University (SGU) is a privately sponsored university and located at Alam Sutera, a community in Tangerang, Banten, Indonesia.

Swiss German University was established in the year 2000 as a joint effort between private investors from Germany and Indonesia. Nowadays, it is run by an Indonesian businessman.

Swiss German University (SGU) is known for its double degree program. SGU partners with several universities in Germany and Switzerland. SGU also requires its students to do an internship twice during their studies, one in Indonesia and one in Germany as part of the requirements for containing the double degree.

Course structure
SGU offers courses that combine both theoretical and practical training (internship). All programs and degrees are internationally recognized (dual degrees).

Students need to complete two internships during their studies to obtain their dual degrees. The first internship will be in Indonesia (domestic) and the second internship will be abroad (usually in Germany or  Switzerland).

Undergraduate programs

Engineering and Information Technology
 Department of Mechanical Engineering (Mechatronics Studies)
 Department of Business Engineering (Industrial Engineering)
 Department of Information Technology (IT)

Life Sciences
 Department of Pharmaceutical Engineering
 Department of Food Technology
 Department of Biomedical Engineering
 Department of Sustainable Energy and Environment

Business and Communications
 Department of International Business Administration
 Department of Accounting
 Department of Hotel and Tourism Management
 Department of Communication and Public Relations
 Department of International Culinary Business

Postgraduate programs
 Master of Business Administration
 Master of Information Technology
 Master of Mechatronics Engineering

External links

Universities in Indonesia
Universities in Banten
2000 establishments in Indonesia
Educational institutions established in 2000